Fort Yukon Airport  is a state-owned public-use airport located in the city of Fort Yukon, in the Yukon–Koyukuk Census Area of the U.S. state of Alaska.

Facilities and aircraft 

For 12-month period ending December 31, 2005, the airport had 8,350 aircraft operations, an average of 22 per day: 60% air taxi, 37% general aviation and 3% military. There are 13 aircraft based at this airport: 85% single engine and 15% multi-engine.

Airlines and destinations 

The following airlines offer scheduled passenger service at this airport:

Prior to its bankruptcy and cessation of all operations, Ravn Alaska served the airport from multiple locations.

Statistics

References

External links
 FAA Alaska airport diagram (GIF)
 
 Resources for this airport:
 
 
 
 
 

Airports in the Arctic
Airports in the Yukon–Koyukuk Census Area, Alaska
Fort Yukon, Alaska